The 2012 Singapore ATP Challenger was a professional tennis tournament played on hard courts. It was the second edition of the tournament which was part of the 2012 ATP Challenger Tour. It took place in Singapore between February 27 and March 4, 2012.

Dmitry Tursunov was the defending champion but decided not to participate. Lu Yen-hsun won the title, defeating Go Soeda 6–3, 6–4 in the final.

Seeds

Draw

Finals

Top half

Bottom half

References

External links
 Main Draw
 Qualifying Draw

Singapore ATP Challenger - Singles
2012 Singles
2012 in Singaporean sport